In computer programming, boilerplate code, or simply boilerplate, are sections of code that are repeated in multiple places with little to no variation. When using languages that are considered verbose, the programmer must write a lot of boilerplate code to accomplish only minor functionality.

The need for boilerplate can be reduced through high-level mechanisms such as metaprogramming (which has the computer automatically write the needed boilerplate code or insert it at compile time), convention over configuration (which provides good default values, reducing the need to specify program details in every project) and model-driven engineering (which uses models and model-to-code generators, eliminating the need for manual boilerplate code).

Origin 

The term arose from the newspaper business. Columns and other pieces that were distributed by print syndicates were sent to subscribing newspapers in the form of prepared printing plates. Because of their resemblance to the metal plates used in the making of boilers, they became known as "boiler plates", and their resulting text—"boilerplate text". As the stories that were distributed by boiler plates were usually "fillers" rather than "serious" news, the term became synonymous with unoriginal, repeated text.

A related term is bookkeeping code, referring to code that is not part of the business logic but is interleaved with it in order to keep data structures updated or handle secondary aspects of the program.

Preamble 
One form of boilerplate consists of declarations which, while not part of the program logic or the language's essential syntax, are added to the start of a source file as a matter of custom. The following Perl example demonstrates boilerplate:

#!/usr/bin/perl
use warnings;
use strict;

The first line is a shebang, which identifies the file as a Perl script that can be executed directly on the command line on Unix/Linux systems. The other two are pragmas turning on warnings and strict mode, which are mandated by fashionable Perl programming style.

This next example is a C/C++ programming language boilerplate, #include guard.

#ifndef MYINTERFACE_H
#define MYINTERFACE_H

...

#endif

This checks, and sets up, a global flag to tell the compiler whether the file myinterface.h has already been included. As many interdepending files may be involved in the compilation of a module, this avoids processing the same header multiple times (which would lead to errors due to multiple definitions with the same name).

In Java and similar platforms 

In Java programs, DTO classes are often provided with methods for getting and setting instance variables. The definitions of these methods can frequently be regarded as boilerplate. Although the code will vary from one class to another, it is sufficiently stereotypical in structure that it would be better generated automatically than written by hand. For example, in the following Java class representing a pet, almost all the code is boilerplate except for the declarations of Pet, name, and owner:

Java 

public class Pet {
    private String name;
    private Person owner;

    public Pet(String name, Person owner) {
        this.name = name;
        this.owner = owner;
    }

    public String getName() {
        return name;
    }

    public void setName(String name) {
        this.name = name;
    }

    public Person getOwner() {
        return owner;
    }

    public void setOwner(Person owner) {
        this.owner = owner;
    }
}

Most of the boilerplate in this example exists to fulfill requirements of JavaBeans. If the variables name and owner were declared as public, the accessor and mutator methods would not be needed.

To reduce the amount of boilerplate, many frameworks have been developed, e.g. Lombok for Java. The same code as above is auto-generated by Lombok using Java annotations, which is a form of metaprogramming:

@AllArgsConstructor
@Getter
@Setter
public class Pet {
    private String name;
    private Person owner;
}

Scala 

In some other programming languages it may be possible to achieve the same thing with less boilerplate, when the language has built-in support for such common constructs. For example, the equivalent of the above Java code can be expressed in Scala using just one line of code:

case class Pet(var name: String, var owner: Person)

C# 

Or in C# using Automatic Properties with compiler generated backing fields:

public class Pet
{
    public string Name { get; set; }
    public Person Owner { get; set; }
}

Starting with C# 9.0 there is an opportunity to use Records which generate classes with Properties automatically:

public record Pet(string Name, Person Owner);

Method boilerplate 
In addition to declarations, methods in OOP languages also contribute to the amount of boilerplate. A 2015 study on popular Java projects shows that 60% of methods can be uniquely identified by the occurrence of 4.6% of its tokens, making the remaining 95.4% boilerplate irrelevant to logic. The researchers believe this result would translate to subroutines in procedural languages in general.

HTML 
In HTML, the following boilerplate is used as a basic empty template and is present in most web pages:
<!DOCTYPE html>
<html lang="en">
<head>
  <meta charset="UTF-8"/>
  <title>Test</title>
</head>
<body>

</body>
</html>
The WHATWG HTML Living Standard defines that the <html>, <head> and <body> tags may be safely omitted under most circumstances. The  tag is technically redundant when coming directly from a web server configured to send the character encoding in an HTTP header, though it becomes useful when the HTML response is saved in an .html file, cache, or web archive. Google's HTML/CSS style guide recommends that all optional tags be omitted, resulting in much less boilerplate. The World Wide Web Consortium states that element <title> must not be empty:
<!DOCTYPE html>
<title>Test</title>

Python 
In Python, the following boilerplate code can be used to modify if code can only be executed in or out of a module context.
if __name__ == '__main__':
    # Anything placed here will never be executed in a module context.
    pass

if __name__ != '__main__':
    # Anything placed here will only be executed in a module context.
    pass

See also

References

Source code
Computer programming folklore
Software engineering folklore
Articles with example Java code